The Fiesch derailment occurred on Friday 23 July  2010, at 11:50 CET when a Glacier Express train, from Zermatt heading towards St. Moritz, derailed at low speed between the cities of Lax and Fiesch, Canton Valais, Switzerland.

Two rear panorama cars were overturned while a third car derailed but remained on the track.

A 64-year-old Japanese woman was killed and 42 people were injured and taken to hospital. The day after the accident 17 persons (16 Japanese, 1 Spanish) were still in hospital care.

The cause of the accident was blamed on human error in that the driver was going too fast. Traffic resumed on Sunday 25 July after repair and the railway had been declared safe by the Matterhorn Gotthard Bahn (operator of the Glacier Express).

On 7 March 2011, it was announced that the engineer of the train at the time of its crash had been convicted of homicide and negligence, and would face a fine of 15,000 Swiss francs.

The Investigation Bureau for Railway, Funicular and Boat Accidents investigated the accident.

References

External links

  - Final report (Archive) Investigation Bureau for Railway, Funicular and Boat Accidents (Original report)
  Japanese translation of the report (Archive) - The IBFRA noted that this is an unofficial provisional translation intended to help Japanese speakers understand the document, and is not legally binding; the original German version is legally binding

Derailments in Switzerland
Railway accidents in 2010
Fiesch Derailment, 2010
2010 disasters in Switzerland

ja:氷河急行#事故